DNA polymerase alpha subunit 2 is an enzyme that in humans is encoded by the POLA2 gene.

Interactions
POLA2 has been shown to interact with PARP1.

See also
 DNA Polymerase
 DNA polymerase alpha

References

Further reading

External links 
 PDBe-KB provides an overview of all the structure information available in the PDB for Human DNA polymerase alpha subunit B